Football at the Lusophone Games was first held in the first edition in Macau, in 2006. Only the men's tournament has been contested so far.

Men's tournament

 
Football
Lusophony Games